A kibbutz is an agriculture-based collective community in Israel.

Kibbutz may also refer to:
Kibbutz (album), an album by the Japanese noise band Merzbow
Kibbutz (film), a 2005 Israeli documentary directed by Racheli Schwartz
A "study group" in a Yeshiva is sometimes referred to as a "Kibbutz" - see  - especially in older usage